Walter Rau Lebensmittelwerke v De Smedt PVBA (1983) Case 261/81 is an EU law case, concerning the free movement of goods in the European Union.

Facts  
A Belgian law required margarine to be marketed in cube shaped packages, to avoid confusion with butter. This was applied to all kinds, domestic and imports. Walter Rau argued that the law contravened (what is now) TFEU article 34.

Judgment
The ECJ held that the measure was not lawful. In principle packaging requirements to prevents consumers being confused would be justified. But it must be ‘also necessary for such rules to be proportionate to the aim in view.’

See also

 Canadian Federation of Agriculture v Quebec (AG): Canadian case on banning margarine
 McCray v. United States: US case on margarine food coloring
European Union law

Notes

References

European Union goods case law
1983 in case law
1983 in Belgium
Food law
Margarine
Food packaging